Tereza Jakschová (born 1 September 1995) is a Czech Paralympic athlete who competes in international track and field competitions, she was born without her left forearm. She is a two-time European medalist in sprinting events. She has also competed at the 2020 Summer Paralympics where she did not medal.

References

1995 births
Living people
Athletes from Prague
Paralympic athletes of the Czech Republic
Czech female sprinters
Athletes (track and field) at the 2020 Summer Paralympics
Medalists at the World Para Athletics European Championships